Chrysesthes is a genus of beetles in the family Buprestidae, containing the following species:

 Chrysesthes auronotata Saunders, 1874
 Chrysesthes gymnopleura (Perty, 1830)
 Chrysesthes lanieri (Chevrolat, 1838)
 Chrysesthes tripunctata (Fabricius, 1787)
 Chrysesthes viridimaculata Lucas, 1858

References

Buprestidae genera